The National Exchange Bank building is a historic building on Capitol Square in Downtown Columbus, Ohio. The building, at 1 W. State St., was constructed in the 1860s as a bank, making it one of the oldest commercial buildings on Capitol Square. Today the building houses a branch of Heartland Bank.

The original bank in the building, the National Exchange Bank of Columbus, was the second national bank organized in the city, established in December 1864. The bank was the only U.S. depository in the city. Its president was William G. Deshler. The bank was liquidated in 1892 and was absorbed by the Deshler National Bank, which was at the site of the Deshler Hotel.

References

External links

 Heartland Bank branch website

Buildings in downtown Columbus, Ohio
1860s establishments in Ohio
Bank buildings in Columbus, Ohio
Buildings and structures completed in the 1860s
High Street (Columbus, Ohio)